Events in the year 2019 in Iceland.

Incumbents
 President: Guðni Th. Jóhannesson
 Prime Minister: Katrín Jakobsdóttir

Events 

 August 18 – 100 activists, officials, and other concerned citizens in Iceland hold a funeral for Okjökull glacier, which has completely melted after once covering .

Births

Deaths 
2 April – Jón Helgason, 87, MP (1974–1995), Minister of Justice (1983–1987) and Agriculture (1987–1988).
15 July – Thorsteinn I. Sigfusson, 65, physicist.
31 December – Guðrún Ögmundsdóttir, 69, politician

See also
 	

 		
 2019 European Parliament election

References 

 
Iceland